Theodore Frye (September 10, 1899 – August 26, 1963) was a gospel composer and singer and an early pioneer of the genre. Along with Thomas A. Dorsey, Frye established the first gospel choir at Ebenezer Missionary Baptist Church in Chicago. He worked with Roberta Martin in the 1930s, forming the Martin-Frye Quartet, and helped launch Mahalia Jackson's career in the 1940s. Frye was a cofounder of both the National Convention of Gospel Choirs and Choruses and the National Baptist Music Convention.

References

1899 births
1963 deaths
Musicians from Chicago
American gospel singers
Gospel music composers